Golden Era Mixtape 2012 is a mixtape by all artists signed to Australian hip hop label Golden Era Records. It was released as a free download  on 30 January 2012 on the Golden Era Records website. The mixtape was launched on Triple J's Hip-Hop show.

Track listing 

 Briggs & Adfu – Intro
 Trials – Super Team
 Sesta – The Fumes That Smell Doom
 Hilltop Hoods feat. Sia – I Love It (Trials remix)
 Vents (cuts by Adfu) – Peacemaker
 Briggs feat. Hau (cuts by Jaytee) – I Wish
 Interlude
 Pressure – Something To Say
 Suffa – Brainbox (remix)
 Debris, Reflux & Adfu – Remain Classic
 Trials feat. K21 (cuts by Adfu) – Soylent Green
 Briggs (cuts by Jaytee) – #sheplife
 Vents & Briggs (cuts by Adfu) – Forget About It
 Vents (cuts by Adfu) – Everyday Is A Blast, Chaos, Fallin’ Medley
 Trials & Adfu (AKA Theory Of Face) – Cambodian Rock, Hello Darkness Medley
 Funkoars – Carl Sagan
 Hons – Whiskey
 Hilltop Hoods – Rattling The Keys To The Kingdom
 Golden Era – Wsup

References

External links 
 Official website

2012 mixtape albums
Record label compilation albums
Hip hop compilation albums
Golden Era Records albums